The Mesquite Kickers were a soccer club based in Mesquite, Texas that competed in the USISL.

Year-by-year

Staff 
 President and General Manager: Shawn McGee

References 

Defunct soccer clubs in Texas
Defunct indoor soccer clubs in the United States
1994 establishments in Texas
1997 disestablishments in Texas
Association football clubs established in 1994
Association football clubs disestablished in 1997
Mesquite, Texas